American vocalist and performer Whitney Houston, nicknamed “The Voice”, embarked on 10 concert tours, 6 of which were world tours and 4 which were territorial tours. After becoming the opening act for singer Jeffrey Osborne and Luther Vandross on their US amphitheatre tour and playing at various American theaters, festivals, and clubs in 1985, she embarked on her first worldwide tour, the successful The Greatest Love Tour in 1986.  With promoting worldwide mega hit album Whitney, her second world tour, The Moment of Truth World Tour started in North America during the summer of 1987 and continued overseas during 1988 in Europe, Japan, Hong Kong, and Australia. Especially in Europe, Houston visited 12 countries, playing to over half a million fans including nine consecutive nights at Wembley Arena in London. She then followed this with sold-out concert tour, Feels So Right Japan Tour in 1990 and I'm Your Baby Tonight World Tour in 1991.

With the enormous success of the film, The Bodyguard, and its accompanying soundtrack, Houston went on her most extensive world tour, The Bodyguard World Tour to support her projects during 1993–1994. Spanning two years, Houston played North America twice, Europe, Japan, and made her first appearances in South America and South Africa. In 1997, she embarked on The Pacific Rim Tour which had her visiting for the first time Thailand and Taiwan. After the success of Houston's first studio album My Love Is Your Love in eight years, the singer embarked on her first world tour since 1994 to promote it in 1999. My Love Is Your Love World Tour was the highest grossing arena concert tour of the year in Europe while playing to almost half a million people. In 2009, Houston started Nothing but Love World Tour, her first tour in over 10 years and supported her seventh and final studio album I Look to You.

During her career, Houston has also made appearances at the various charity concerts such as Freedomfest: Nelson Mandela's 70th Birthday Celebration (1988), A Benefit Concert for The United Negro College Fund (1988), That's What Friends Are For: AIDS Benefit Concert (1990), Welcome Home Heroes with Whitney Houston (1991) and Classic Whitney: Live from Washington, D.C. (1997).

Concert tours

World tours

Regional tours

Benefit concerts

Other notable appearances

Performances at award shows

1980s

1990s

2000s

2010s

References 

Houston, Whitney